Iranolacerta brandtii, also known commonly as Brandt's Persian lizard, is a species of lizard in the family Lacertidae. The species is native to eastern Europe and western Asia. There are two recognized subspecies.

Etymology
I. brandtii is named after Johann Friedrich von Brandt, a German zoologist, surgeon, pharmacologist, and botanist.

Geographic range
I. brandtii is found in southern Azerbaijan, northwestern Iran, and Turkey.

Habitat

Reproduction
I. brandti is oviparous.

Subspecies
Two subspecies are recognized as being valid, including the nominotypical subspecies.
Iranolacerta brandtii brandtii 
Iranolacerta brandtii esfahanica 

Nota bene: A trinomial authority in parentheses indicates that the subspecies was originally described in a genus other than Iranolacerta.

References

Further reading
Arnold EN, Arribas OJ, Carranza S (2007). "Systematics of the Palaearctic and Oriental lizard tribe Lacertini (Squamata: Lacertidae: Lacertinae), with descriptions of eight new genera". Zootaxa 1430: 1–86. (Iranolacerta brandtii, new combination, p. 46).
Avci A, Ilgaz Ç, Bozkurt E, Üzüm N, Olgun K (2015). "A New Record of Iranolacerta brandtii (De Filippi, 1863) (Sauria: Lacertidae) in Eastern Anatolia Turkey". Russian Journal of Herpetology 22 (1): 68–74.
De Filippi F (1863). "Nuove o poco note specie di animali vertebrati raccolte in un viaggio in Persia nell' estate dell' anno 1862 [= New or Little-known Species of Vertebrate Animals Collected on a Journey in Persia in the Summer of the Year 1862]". Archivio per la Zoologia l'Anatomia e la Fisiologia 2: 377–394. (Lacerta brandtii, new species, p. 387). (in Italian and Latin).
Nilson G, Rastegar-Pouyani N, Rastegar-Pouyani E, Andrén C (2003). "Lacertas of south and central Zagros Mountains, Iran, with description of two new taxa". Russian J. Herpetol. 10 (1): 11–24. (Lacerta brandtii esfahanica, new subspecies, pp. 15–18, Figure 2).
Sindaco R, Jeremčenko VK (2008). The Reptiles of the Western Palearctic. 1. Annotated Checklist and Distributional Atlas of the Turtles, Crocodiles, Amphisbaenians and Lizards of Europe, North Africa, Middle East and Central Asia. (Monographs of the Societas Herpetologica Italica). Latina, Italy: Edizioni Belvedere. 580 pp. . (Lacerta brandti).

Iranolacerta
Reptiles of Azerbaijan
Reptiles of Iran
Reptiles of Turkey
Reptiles described in 1863
Taxa named by Filippo De Filippi